Luciocyprinus is a genus of cyprinid fish found in China and Southeast Asia.  There are currently two described species in this genus.

Species
 Luciocyprinus langsoni Vaillant, 1904
 Luciocyprinus striolatus G. H. Cui & X. L. Chu, 1986

References
 

Cyprinidae genera
Cyprinid fish of Asia